Radio Corporation of the Philippines, presently operating as Radyo Pilipino Media Group, is the Philippine broadcasting company. Originally founded in 1924, it is the oldest radio network in the Philippines; its current incarnation was founded on June 25, 1985, by a consortium led by businessman-politician Eduardo Cojuangco Jr.

The Radyo Pilipino group is composed of five broadcast companies owned by Lucky Star Holdings: Radyo Pilipino Corporation, RadioCorp, Philippine Radio Corporation (PhilRadio), Radio Audience Developers Integrated Organization Inc. (RADIO Inc.), and Beacon Communications Systems Inc. (BCSI).

Currently, Radyo Pilipino Media Group owns two national radio brands, namely the AM network Radyo Pilipino (formerly known as Radyo Asenso), and the FM network One FM, and its lone television station RTV Tarlac Channel 26.

History
KZKZ (AM) is the second radio station in the Philippines owned by Henry Herman Sr. in 1922. It broadcast using a 5-watt transmitter. In 1924, it boosted its power to 100 watts. A few months later, Radio Corporation of the Philippines bought KZKZ AM from Henry Hermann. In 1926 the company began to work on constructing two of the largest radio stations in Asia with the idea of maintaining direct Manila-San Francisco service.

On April 7, 1980, Radyo Pilipino Corporation was founded, with the acquisition of Tarlac AM station DZTC in 1981.

On June 25, 1985, the current incarnation of RadioCorp was founded by a consortium led by Eduardo Cojuangco Jr. following the acquisition of 96.1 DWXT, an FM station located in Tarlac (Cojuangco's home province).

In 2015, RadioCorp officially ventured into television broadcasting with the launch of the network's first television station, DWRP-TV 26 on January 15. RCP TV 26 affiliated with CNN Philippines and Radio Philippines Network until 2021.

It also produces the weekly business show Asenso Pinoy, which airs every Saturday at 6:30 AM on A2Z Channel 11.

In 2019, the RadioCorp group formally restructured its operations under a new name: Radyo Pilipino Media Group (named after Radyo Pilipino Corporation). With the relaunch, the Radyo Asenso network and its radio stations were rebranded under its namesake brand.

In 2021, after severing ties with RPN and CNN Philippines, DWRP-TV was rebranded as RTV Tarlac Channel 26 and became an independent station.

Radio stations

AM stations

FM stations

Internet radio stations
Presently, Radyo Pilipino Media Group operates its own online stations under Radyo Pilipino and One FM brands broadcasting from its Manila studios. These online stations are also enacted as "network" feeds for their national programs via hookup to selected stations.

Television stations

References

External links
 
 One FM

Radio stations in the Philippines
Philippine radio networks
Mass media companies of the Philippines
Companies based in Manila
Philippine companies established in 1924
Mass media companies established in 1924
Privately held companies